Bembecia staryi is a moth of the family Sesiidae. It is found in the Kaçkar Mountains in Georgia and Turkey.

References

Moths described in 1992
Sesiidae
Moths of Europe
Moths of Asia